, known exclusively by his stage name Heath, is a Japanese musician and singer-songwriter. He is best known as bass guitarist of the rock band X Japan. He joined the group in August 1992, replacing Taiji Sawada who left earlier in the year. Heath stayed with X Japan until their dissolution in 1997 and reunited with the band in 2007.

After X Japan's breakup he focused on his solo career. In 2000, he founded Dope HEADz with X Japan guitarist Pata and former Spread Beaver percussionist/programmer I.N.A. The group ceased activity after its second album in 2002.

His stage name comes from his nickname "Hi-chan", which he adopted before 1986.

Career

1986–2006: Early bands, X Japan, solo career and other work

Heath's first known band was the heavy metal group Paranoia which he joined in 1986 as bassist. They released one album in 1987 before splitting up, with vocalist Nov moving on to the thrash metal band Aion. In 1988 Heath joined Sweet Beet as vocalist for a year. In 1990 he moved to Tokyo, got introduced to hide of X through a mutual friend, and attended their Nippon Budokan concert.

In 1991 Heath played at Extasy Summit '91, an event put on by X drummer Yoshiki's Extasy Records, with a band called Majestic Isabelle. In April 1992 he joined Sweet Death, whom he had previously played with in 1990. Sweet Death was a band produced by Extasy, that same year the band's new leader Kiyoshi (who years later joined Spread Beaver), decided to change their name to Media Youth. Heath did not stay with them long, because in May hide invited him to join X Japan after a rehearsal with the band.

In June he left Media Youth and on August 24, 1992, at a press conference in New York at Rockefeller Center, it was announced that he had joined X. His first concert with them was the October 1992 Extasy Summit, and the following year they released Art of Life, which topped the Oricon chart. However, that year the members of X Japan took a break to start solo projects. Dahlia, which would become the band's last album, was released on November 4, 1996, and once again, it reached the number one spot. In September 1997, it was announced that X Japan would disband. They performed their farewell show, aptly titled "The Last Live", at the Tokyo Dome on December 31, 1997.

In 1995, Heath released his self-titled first solo album. His second, Gang Age Cubist, followed in 1998. For the 1999 hide tribute album, Tribute Spirits, Heath teamed up with X Japan guitarist Pata and former Spread Beaver percussionist/programmer I.N.A. to cover the song "Celebration". He reunited with them in 2000 when they formed Dope HEADz, adding vocalist Jo:Ya. They released two singles and an album in 2002 when they recruited new singer Shame and released Planet of Dope, but ceased activity soon after its release.

On December 29, 2003, the bassist announced a new project called Rats, but after the release of their re-recording of Heath's "Traitor", the project was ended on August 29, 2004. That same year he formed a band called Lynx, with Der Zibet vocalist Issay, but they did not release any recordings. In 2005, Heath restarted his solo activities after a seven-year hiatus.

2007–present: X Japan reunion

According to a report by the newspaper Sponichi, X Japan vocalist Toshi visited drummer Yoshiki in Los Angeles in November 2006 to work on a song as a tribute to hide. In March 2007, Toshi announced on his website that he and Yoshiki had recently resumed working together, stating that a "new project" would commence soon. Rumors of a X Japan reunion subsequently began, and in June Yoshiki was reported as having expressed interest in a tour and that he was in talks with Heath and Pata regarding their participation. On October 22, 2007, X Japan announced their reunion and released the Saw IV theme song, "I.V.".

In mid-March 2009, it was reported in the media that Heath was having issues with his personal management agency, that X Japan's concerts in South Korea on the 21st and 22nd were cancelled as a result, and that the bassist might leave the band. On April 20, Heath's offer to withdraw from X Japan was confirmed to Sankei Sports, but it was not accepted by bandleader Yoshiki. The day before their May 2009 Tokyo Dome concerts, Heath explained that he was questioning who he was as an artist, but decided to stay in the band after talking to Yoshiki.

In 2010, X Japan went on their first North American tour from September 25 to October 10. Their first world tour began with four gigs in Europe from June 28 to July 4, 2011, and was resumed from September to October with five shows in South America and five in Asia.

In response to the 2011 Tōhoku earthquake and tsunami that occurred in Japan on March 11, Heath supported X Japan vocalist Toshi in eight concerts throughout western Japan. All of the shows were acoustic in support of nationwide power conservation efforts and also featured Luna Sea's Shinya and the Orchestra Ensemble Kanazawa. All proceeds were donated to the Japanese Red Cross to aid the victims.

Equipment

Heath uses Fernandes bass guitars; currently using his signature model FJB-115H. He also had a signature model with Burny, produced by Fernandes, the DB-85H. When he first joined X Japan he used a Burny WB-X and then a Burny EB-X from 1993 until getting a signature model.

Discography
 Solo
 Heath (February 22, 1995)
 , Oricon Peak Position: #10
Second ending theme for the Detective Conan anime.
 "Traitor" (February 19, 1997) #35
Theme song for the TV series Toro Asia and the Sega Saturn video game Phantasm.
 "Crack Yourself" (April 22, 1998) #76
 Gang Age Cubist (June 10, 1998) #43
 "New Skin" (2005, CD and DVD)
 "Come to Daddy" (2005, CD and DVD)
 "The Live" (2005, CD and DVD)
 "Solid" (August 25, 2006)
 Desert Rain (July 16, 2006)
 "Sweet Blood" (November, 2009, distributed at fan club event Sweet Vibration)

VHS/DVD
 Heath (February 22, 1995, sold with 1st solo album)
 Heath of All Films 1995.02.22 ~ 1997.12.31 (December 27, 1998)

Other media
 Heath (March 30, 1993, music score book)
 「Solid」 (January 10, 2005, CD-ROM)
 Six Nine Cell (2005, CD-ROM)
 Innosent World (January 1, 2007, CD-ROM)

 With Paranoia
 Come From Behind (1987)

 With Dope HEADz
 "Glow" (February 21, 2001) #35
 "True Lies" (April 25, 2001) #35
 Primitive Impulse (June 6, 2001) #20
 Planet of the Dope (July 24, 2002) #59

 With Rats
 "Traitor" (2004, comes with live documentary DVD, Dirty High)

With X Japan

Other work
Tribute Spirits (Various artists, May 1, 1999, "Celebration")
"Red Swan" (Yoshiki feat. Hyde, October 3, 2018, guest bass)

References

External links

 Official website
 Lynx's official page

1968 births
Living people
X Japan members
Visual kei musicians
People from Amagasaki
20th-century Japanese male singers
20th-century Japanese singers
21st-century Japanese male singers
21st-century Japanese singers
Japanese rock bass guitarists
Japanese heavy metal bass guitarists
Japanese male rock singers
Japanese male singer-songwriters
Male bass guitarists
20th-century bass guitarists
21st-century bass guitarists
ca:Heath